50 Lekë (50 L) have a value of 50 Albanian lek.

References

Currencies of Albania
Fifty-base-unit coins